Sir Thomas Tyringham Bernard, 6th Baronet (15 September 1791 – 8 May 1883) was a British Liberal Party politician and baronet.

Bernard was the son of Sir Scrope Bernard-Morland, 4th Baronet and Hannah Morland and was educated at Eton and Christ Church, Oxford. In 1816 he served as High Sheriff of Buckinghamshire.

He was elected at 1857 general election as the Member of Parliament (MP) for Aylesbury. He was re-elected in 1859, and held the seat until he stood down at the 1865 general election.

He succeeded to the Baronetcy in 1876 on the death of his elder brother Francis.

He died in 1883 at age 91 in Chelsea, London. He had married three times, firstly, Sophia Charlotte Williams, daughter of David Williams in 1819; secondly, Martha Louisa Minshull, daughter of William Minshull, in 1840 and thirdly, Ellen Elwes in 1864. He had no children.

References

External links 

High Sheriffs of Buckinghamshire
1791 births
1883 deaths
Liberal Party (UK) MPs for English constituencies
UK MPs 1857–1859
UK MPs 1859–1865
Baronets in the Baronetage of Great Britain
People educated at Eton College
Alumni of Christ Church, Oxford